Sir Edward Gerald Hawkesworth, KCMG, MC (died 14 Aug. 1949) was a British colonial administrator. He was Governor of British Honduras from 1947 to 1948.

References 

 https://www.ukwhoswho.com/view/10.1093/ww/9780199540891.001.0001/ww-9780199540884-e-226581

1949 deaths
Governors of British Honduras
Grenadier Guards officers